A salt lick is a salt deposit that animals regularly lick.

Salt lick or Saltlick may also refer to:

Places

Bodies of water
Saltlick Creek (Little Kanawha River), a tributary of the Little Kanawha River in West Virginia
Salt Lick Creek (Susquehanna River), a tributary of the Susquehanna River in Pennsylvania

Communities
Salt Lick, Kentucky, a city in Bath County
Salt Lick Town, also known as Seekunk, a Mingo village destroyed by William Crawford during Dunmore's War
Saltlick Township, Fayette County, Pennsylvania

Music
Albums
 Salt Lick/God's Balls, an album released by the band Tad
Songs
 "Salt Lick", a song on the Jeff Coffin album, Commonality
 "Salt Lick", the first ZZ Top single
 "Salt Lick", a song on the Tribal Tech album, Face First
 "Airstream Trailer Orgy / Salt Lick Blues", a song on the Gamble Rogers album, Sorry Is As Sorry Does
 "The Salt Lick", a song on the Gaelic Storm album, Bring Yer Wellies

Brands and enterprises
 Salt Lick Publishing, publishers of the monthly magazine QSaltLake
 The Salt Lick, a barbecue restaurant in Driftwood, Texas

See also